Sorry! is the debut studio album by American alternative rock band Catherine. It was released on November 1, 1994, through TVT Records.

Critical reception
The Washington Post wrote: "The motto on the front of Catherine's Sorry -- 'better living through noise' -- seems about as dated as the sound of this Chicago quintet." Chicago Reader called it "pleasant but not ground breaking."

Track listing

Personnel 

 Catherine

 Jerome Brown – bass guitar, guitar
 Kerry Brown – drums, guitar, percussion
 Cliff Fox – bass guitar, guitar
 Neil Jendon – guitar, keyboards, slide guitar, vocals
 Mark Rew – guitar, vocals

 Additional personnel

 Bobby English – guitar
 Eric Remschneider – cello on tracks 5 and 7
 John Siket – banjo, guitar
 Lawrence Whipple – guitar

 Production

 Kerry Brown – engineering, mixing at Smart Studios, Madison, Wisconsin, recording at Soundworks, Chicago
 Jeff Burk – engineering assisting
 Catherine – production
 Bobby English – amplifiers, guitar technician
 Greg Knoll – sleeve art direction
 Jeff Moleski – engineering, recording
 John Siket – mixing at Smart Studios, Madison, Wisconsin
 Jim Stallman – additional percussion on tracks 4, 9, and 11
 Mark Tremblay – engineering assisting
 Howie Weinberg – mastering at Masterdisk, New York City

References

External links 
 

1994 albums
TVT Records albums
Catherine (alternative rock band) albums